Nasser Katouzian was an Iranian jurist, lawyer and emeritus at the University of Tehran.

Katouzian was regarded a prominent national figure and was a member of the committee in charge of writing a draft for the Constitution of the Islamic Republic of Iran, along with Hassan Habibi, Ja'fari-Langeroudi, Nasser Minachi and Ahmad Sayyed Javadi. He then ran for an Assembly of Experts for Constitution seat from Tehran constituency, however he was not elected. Katouzian was purged during Iranian Cultural Revolution and removed from his professorship position. Later, he was invited to assume his own position again.

References 

1927 births
2014 deaths
20th-century Iranian lawyers
Recipients of the Order of Culture and Art
Academic staff of the University of Tehran